"Lady on the Rock" is a song written by Joe Vitale, Bill Szymczyk and Stephen Stills. The song was released in 1981 as a single from Vitale's second solo studio album, Plantation Harbor (1981), and reached number 47 on the Billboard Mainstream Rock chart. The track is titled "Lady on the Rock (It's America)" on the single release.

The track is a patriotic anthem about the Statue of Liberty, and how America is the land of the free.

The song received some airplay in the US on album-oriented rock radio and became quite popular. This airplay pushed the single to No. 47 on the Mainstream Rock Tracks and helped the album Plantation Harbor chart.

Personnel
Musicians
 Joe Vitale – lead and backing vocals, drums, percussion, synthesizer, spoken word
 George "Chocolate" Perry – bass guitar
 Paul Harris – clavinet
 Joe Walsh – lead and rhythm guitars, spoken word
 Don Felder – rhythm guitar
 Marilyn "Mini" Martin – backing vocals

References

1981 singles
1981 songs
Asylum Records singles
Songs written by Stephen Stills
Song recordings produced by Bill Szymczyk
Songs written by Joe Vitale (musician)